The Corrective Work Order, commonly known as CWO, is a Singaporean law meted out to 'litterbugs', those who are caught littering in a public street. It is one of the two penalties against littering in the country, with the other being a fine.

Overview
The order forces the 'litterbugs' to clean up a specified location as ordered by the government, while wearing a bright green luminous vest bearing the words "Corrective Work Order". The punishment aims to force the offender to rehabilitate and shame litterbugs in public to deter others from committing the similar offence. It may also be meted out together with a fine.

Results
Corrective Work Order was intended for repeat offenders only. Introduced in 1992, it proved to be very successful. Littering offenses significantly dropped, and there were very few repeat offenders. Occasionally, a few who served Corrective Work Order had their faces photographed by The Straits Times and published on the front cover. Litterbugs serving Corrective Work Order usually have their faces covered with a mask or plastic bag (which is legal) to avoid being identified by members of the public.

However, media interest long since tailed off, and there is some evidence that the sentence may now be less effective as a deterrent to littering by the general public. Nevertheless, the CWO remains in force.

References

External links
Corrective Work Order Act

Punishments in Singapore
Singapore government policies
Masks in law